Marty Boyle is an Irish Gaelic footballer who plays for Naomh Conaill and also, formerly, for the Donegal county team.

In 2005, Boyle played for his club in the final of the Donegal Senior Football Championship. He played (and scored) for his club in the final of the 2010 Donegal Senior Football Championship. He then played for his club in the final of the 2015 Donegal Senior Football Championship. His team won all three games.

He also played for his club in the final of the 2019 Donegal Senior Football Championship. They won, following a second replay.

He made a substitute appearance for his club in the final of the 2020 Donegal Senior Football Championship. They won, following extra-time and a penalty shoot-out.

Jim McGuinness called Boyle into the Donegal senior team ahead of the 2011 Dr McKenna Cup following his club success of 2010. He received his first championship start in the 2011 Ulster Senior Football Championship quarter-final against Cavan at Breffni Park, with Frank McGlynn absent due to a torn hamstring. In the 2011 All-Ireland Senior Football Championship semi-final, Dublin player Diarmuid Connolly punched Boyle in the face and then grabbed him by the throat; Connolly was red carded as a result. Boyle sat on the bench during Donegal's 2012 All-Ireland Senior Football Championship Final win.

References

External links
 Official profile

1980s births
Living people
Donegal inter-county Gaelic footballers
Naomh Conaill Gaelic footballers